Yanshi District is a district in the prefecture-level city of Luoyang in western Henan province, China. Yanshi lies on the Luo River and is the easternmost county-level division of Luoyang.

History
After the Zhou conquest of Shang in mid-11th century BC, King Wu of Zhou founded a garrison town to the east of modern Yanshi to accommodate some of the campaigning troops. When Qin annexed Zhou in 256 BC, Yanshi County was established. The county's borders underwent several changes over the course of history.

In 1993, Yanshi County became the county-level Yanshi City.

In 2021, it became Yanshi District.

Administrative divisions
As of 2012, Yanshi is divided to 11 towns and 3 townships.
Towns

Townships

Climate

Archaeological sites
There are two important archaeological sites in this area.

Erlitou site
The Erlitou culture (1900–1500 BC) was discovered in Yanshi in 1959. Erlitou is the name of the modern village nearby; the traditional name of the settlement was Zhenxun (Zhēnxún).

Yanshi Shang City
Some scholarsincluding the Xia–Shang–Zhou Chronology Projectidentify it with the first Shang dynasty capital, Western Bo (Xībó) which was traditionally credited to King Tang after his defeat of the Xia dynasty.

See also 
 Battle of Yanshi

References

External links

 
Districts of Luoyang